A melanocytic nevus (also known as nevocytic nevus, nevus-cell nevus and commonly as a mole) is usually a noncancerous condition of pigment-producing skin cells. It is a type of melanocytic tumor that contains nevus cells. Some sources equate the term mole with "melanocytic nevus", but there are also sources that equate the term mole with any nevus form.

The majority of moles appear during the first two decades of a person's life, with about one in every 100 babies being born with moles. Acquired moles are a form of benign neoplasm, while congenital moles, or congenital nevi, are considered a minor malformation or hamartoma and may be at a higher risk for melanoma. A mole can be either subdermal (under the skin) or a pigmented growth on the skin, formed mostly of a type of cell known as a melanocyte. The high concentration of the body's pigmenting agent, melanin, is responsible for their dark color. Moles are a member of the family of skin lesions known as nevi and can occur in all mammalian species, but have been documented most extensively in humans, dogs, and horses.

Signs and symptoms

According to the American Academy of Dermatology, the most common types of moles are skin tags, raised moles and flat moles. Benign moles are usually brown, tan, pink or black (especially on dark-colored skin). They are circular or oval and are usually small (commonly between 1–3 mm), though some can be larger than the size of a typical pencil eraser (>5 mm). Some moles produce dark, coarse hair. Common mole hair removal procedures include plucking, cosmetic waxing, electrolysis, threading and cauterization.

Aging
Moles tend to appear during early childhood and during the first 30 years of life. They may change slowly, becoming raised, changing color or gradually fading. Most people have between 30 and 40 moles, but some have as many as 600.

The number of moles a person has was found to have a correlation with telomere length. However, the relation between telomeres and aging remains uncertain.

Complications
The American Academy of Dermatology says that the vast majority of moles are benign. Data on the chances of transformation from melanocytic nevus to melanoma is controversial, but it appears that about 10% of malignant melanomas have a precursor lesion, of which about 10% are melanocytic nevi.  Therefore, it appears that malignant melanoma quite seldom (1% of cases) has a melanocytic nevus as a precursor.

Cause
The cause is not clearly understood, but is thought to be caused by a defect in embryologic development. This is in the first twelve weeks of pregnancy. The defect is thought to cause a proliferation of melanocytes. This means melanocytes, the cells in the body in charge of normal skin color, are being produced at an extremely fast rate, thus causing the melanocytes to form in clusters instead of spreading out, causing abnormal skin pigmentation in some areas of the body.

Genetics
Genes can have an influence on a person's moles.

Dysplastic nevus syndrome is a largely hereditary condition which causes a person to have a large quantity of moles (often 100 or more) with some larger than normal or atypical. This often leads to a higher risk of melanoma, a serious skin cancer. Dysplastic nevi are more likely than ordinary moles to become cancerous. Dysplastic nevi are common, and many people have a few of these abnormal moles. Having more than 50 ordinary moles increases the risk of developing melanoma.

In the overall population, a slight majority of melanomas do not form in an existing mole, but rather create a new growth on the skin. Somewhat surprisingly, this also applies to those with dysplastic nevi. They are at a higher risk of melanoma occurring not only where there is an existing mole, but also where there are none. Such persons need to be checked regularly for any changes in their moles and to note any new ones.

Sunlight
Ultraviolet light from the sun causes premature aging of the skin and skin damage that can lead to melanoma. Some scientists hypothesize that overexposure to UV, including excessive sunlight, may play a role in the formation of acquired moles. However, more research is needed to determine the complex interaction between genetic makeup and overall exposure to ultraviolet light. Some strong indications that this is so (but falling short of proof), are:
The relative lack of moles on the buttocks of people with dysplastic nevi.
Freckles (spots of melanin on the skin, and distinct from moles) are known to be influenced by sunlight.

Studies have found that sunburns and too much time in the sun can increase the risk factors for melanoma. This is in addition to those who have dysplastic nevi being at higher risk of this cancer (the uncertainty is in regard to acquiring benign moles). To prevent and reduce the risk of melanoma caused by UV radiation, the American Academy of Dermatology and the National Cancer Institute recommends staying out of the sun between 10 a.m. and 4 p.m. standard time (or whenever one's shadow is shorter than one's height). The National Cancer Institute also recommends wearing long sleeves and trousers, hats with a wide brim, sunscreens, and sunglasses that have UV-deflecting lenses.

Diagnosis

Clinical diagnosis can be made with the naked eye using the ABCD guideline or by using dermatoscopy. An online-screening test is also available to help screen out benign moles.

Classification
Melanocytic nevi can mainly be classified by depth, being congenital versus acquired, and/or specific dermatoscopy or histopathology patterns:
Depth

Congenital versus acquired
Congenital nevus: Small to large nevus present at or near time of birth.  Small ones have low potential for forming melanomas, however the risk increases with size, as in the giant pigmented nevus.
Acquired nevus:  Any melanocytic nevus that is not a congenital nevus or not present at birth or near birth.

Specific dermatoscopy or histopathology patterns

Recurrence
Recurrent nevus:  Any incompletely removed nevus with residual melanocytes left in the surgical wound. It creates a dilemma for the patient and physician, as these scars cannot be distinguished from a melanoma.

Differentiation from melanoma
It often requires a dermatologist to fully evaluate moles. For instance, a small blue or bluish-black spot, often called a blue nevus, is usually benign but often mistaken for melanoma. Conversely, a junctional nevus, which develops at the junction of the dermis and epidermis, is potentially cancerous.

A basic reference chart used for consumers to spot suspicious moles is found in the mnemonic A-B-C-D, used by institutions such as the American Academy of Dermatology and the National Cancer Institute. The letters stand for asymmetry, border, color, and diameter. Sometimes, the letter E (for elevation or evolving) is added. According to the American Academy of Dermatology, if a mole starts changing in size, color, shape or, especially, if the border of a mole develops ragged edges or becomes larger than a pencil eraser, it would be an appropriate time to consult with a physician. Other warning signs include a mole, even if smaller than a pencil eraser, that is different from the others and begins to crust over, bleed, itch, or become inflamed. The changes may indicate developing melanomas. The matter can become clinically complicated because mole removal depends on which types of cancer, if any, come into suspicion.

A recent and novel method of melanoma detection is the "ugly duckling sign" It is simple, easy to teach, and highly effective in detecting melanoma. Simply, correlation of common characteristics of a person's skin lesion is made. Lesions which greatly deviate from the common characteristics are labeled as an "ugly duckling", and further professional exam is required. The "little red riding hood sign", suggests that individuals with fair skin and light colored hair might have difficult-to-diagnose melanomas. Extra care and caution should be rendered when examining such individuals as they might have multiple melanomas and severely dysplastic nevi. A dermatoscope must be used to detect "ugly ducklings", as many melanomas in these individuals resemble non-melanomas or are considered to be "wolves in sheep clothing". These fair skinned individuals often have lightly pigmented or amelanotic melanomas which will not present easy-to-observe color changes and variation in colors. The borders of these amelanotic melanomas are often indistinct, making visual identification without a dermatoscope very difficult.

People with a personal or family history of skin cancer or of dysplastic nevus syndrome (multiple atypical moles) should see a dermatologist at least once a year to be sure they are not developing melanoma.

Management

First, a diagnosis must be made. If the lesion is a seborrheic keratosis, then shave excision, electrodesiccation or cryosurgery may be performed, usually leaving very little if any scarring. If the lesion is suspected to be a skin cancer, a skin biopsy must be done first, before considering removal. This is unless an excisional biopsy is warranted. If the lesion is a melanocytic nevus, one has to decide if it is medically indicated or not.

If a melanocytic nevus is suspected of being a melanoma, it needs to be sampled or removed and sent for microscopic evaluation by a pathologist by a method called skin biopsy. One can do a complete excisional skin biopsy or a punch skin biopsy, depending on the size and location of the original nevus. Other reasons for removal may be cosmetic, or because a raised mole interferes with daily life (e.g., shaving). Removal can be by excisional biopsy or by shaving. A shaved site leaves a red mark on the site which returns to the patient's usual skin color in about two weeks. However, there might still be a risk of spread of the melanoma, so the methods of Melanoma diagnosis, including excisional biopsy, are still recommended even in these instances. Additionally, moles can be removed by laser, surgery or electrocautery.

In properly trained hands, some medical lasers are used to remove flat moles level with the surface of the skin, as well as some raised moles. While laser treatment is commonly offered and may require several appointments, other dermatologists think lasers are not the best method for removing moles because the laser only cauterizes or, in certain cases, removes very superficial levels of skin. Moles tend to go deeper into the skin than non-invasive lasers can penetrate. After a laser treatment a scab is formed, which falls off about seven days later, in contrast to surgery, where the wound has to be sutured. A second concern about the laser treatment is that if the lesion is a melanoma, and was misdiagnosed as a benign mole, the procedure might delay diagnosis. If the mole is incompletely removed by the laser, and the pigmented lesion regrows, it might form a recurrent nevus.

Electrocautery is available as an alternative to laser cautery. Electrocautery is a procedure that uses a light electrical current to burn moles, skin tags, and warts off the skin. Electric currents are set to a level such that they only reach the outermost layers of the skin, thus reducing the problem of scarring. Approximately 1–3 treatments may be needed to completely remove a mole. Typically, a local anesthetic is applied to the treated skin area before beginning the mole removal procedure.

For surgery, many dermatologic and plastic surgeons first use a freezing solution, usually liquid nitrogen, on a raised mole and then shave it away with a scalpel. If the surgeon opts for the shaving method, he or she usually also cauterizes the stump. Because a circle is difficult to close with stitches, the incision is usually elliptical or eye-shaped. However, freezing should not be done to a nevus suspected to be a melanoma, as the ice crystals can cause pathological changes called "freezing artifacts" which might interfere with the diagnosis of the melanoma.

Mole removal risks
Mole removal risks mainly depend on the type of mole removal method the patient undergoes. First, mole removal may be followed by some discomfort that can be relieved with pain medication. Second, there is a risk that a scab will form or that redness will occur. However, such scabs and redness usually heal within one or two weeks. Third, as in other surgeries, there is also risk of infection or an anesthetic allergy or even nerve damage. Lastly, the mole removal may imply an uncomfortable scar depending on the mole size.

Society and culture

Throughout human history, individuals who have possessed facial moles have been subject to ridicule and attack based on superstition.  Throughout most of history, facial moles were not considered objects of beauty on lovely faces. Rather most moles were considered hideous growths that appeared mostly on the noses, cheeks, and chins of witches, frogs and other low creatures.

Both folklore and modern popular culture use physical traits to denote a character's either good or evil tendencies. In contrast to the fine features and smooth skin of its heroes and heroines, characters who possess negative or evil characteristics have also been known to possess more rugged features and skin blemishes, including facial moles.

During the Salem witch trials, warts and other dermatological lesions such as moles, scars, and other blemishes, when found on accused women were considered evidence of a pact with the devil.

Face mole reading
In traditional Chinese culture, facial moles are respected and they are used in moleomancy, or face mole reading. The moles' meaning varies according to which of the nine "wealth spots" of the face they are located in. Depending on their position and color, a person's facial moles may render their face "lucky" or "unlucky."

Moles that can be easily seen may be considered warnings or reminders, while hidden moles may symbolize good luck and fortune. Furthermore, traditional Chinese culture holds that each facial mole indicates the presence of a corresponding mole on another part of the body. For instance, if a mole is present around the mouth, a corresponding mole should be found in the pubic region.

See also
Mole map
Beauty mark

References

External links

Common Moles, Dysplastic Nevi, and Risk of Melanoma - National Cancer Institute.

Melanocytic nevi and neoplasms
Benign neoplasms